The Saint Louis Billikens men's soccer team is an intercollegiate varsity sports team of Saint Louis University. The Saint Louis Billikens compete in the Atlantic 10 Conference in the National Collegiate Athletic Association Division I.  Soccer is the main fall sport at SLU, which has not sponsored football since 1949.

Noted for their dominance in men's collegiate soccer during the late 1950s through the mid-1970s, the Billikens have won 10 NCAA Men's Soccer Championships, the most of any men's college soccer program in Division 1. Despite this, the Billikens have not appeared in an NCAA national championship final since 1974, and have appeared in the college cup twice since then: 1991 and 1997. Of their ten titles, nine were outright earned by the Billikens and their 1972 title was shared with San Francisco Dons.

During their dynasty run from the 1960s through 1970s, the team was coached by Bob Guelker during their first five championships, while Harry Keough coached the last five championship teams at SLU. Dan Donigan was the most recent head coach, serving from February 2001 until he resigned in January 2010 to accept a position at Rutgers. Presently, the Billikens are coached by Kevin Kalish.

Roster

Coaching staff

Head coaching history

Seasons

NCAA Dominance: 1959–1974

The following table shows the sixteen-year span from 1959 to 1974 in which SLU won 10 NCAA titles. In the six seasons in which SLU did not win, they finished second three times, reached the semifinals once, reached the quarterfinals once, and reached the round-of-16 once. In all 16 seasons, the NCAA tournament was either won by SLU or by the team that had beaten SLU.

Notable alumni 
1950s–1980s
 Mike Shanahan (1960) — Played on 1959 and 1960 championship teams
 Carl Gentile (1965) — Played with the St. Louis Stars of the North American Soccer League; earned 6 caps with the U.S. national team
 Pat McBride (1967) — Played 10 seasons with the St. Louis Stars of the North American Soccer League; earned 5 caps with the U.S. national team
 Al Trost (1970) — Played with the St. Louis Stars and other teams in the North American Soccer League; earned 14 caps with the U.S. national team
 Pat Leahy (1972) — Played on three of the school's national championship soccer teams; placekicker for the NFL's New York Jets from 1974 to 1992 & Jets' all-time leading scorer
 Joe Clarke (1975) — Played professional soccer for 7 seasons, including stints with NASL's St. Louis Stars and MISL's St. Louis Steamers
 Jim Kavanaugh (1985) — Played in the Major Indoor Soccer League; co-founder and CEO of World Wide Technology.

1990s–present
 Mike Sorber (1992) — 67 caps playing for the U.S. national team; played 7 professional seasons from 1994 to 2000 in Mexico and then in MLS
 Brian McBride (1993) — scored 30 goals for the U.S. national team; played several seasons in the English Premier League
 Shane Battelle (1993) — played 3 professional seasons from 1994 to 1996
 Matt McKeon (1995) — played 7 seasons in MLS; 2 caps with the U.S. national team 
 Brad Davis (2001) — currently plays for Houston Dynamo; 17 caps with the U.S. national team
 Dipsy Selolwane (2001) — played 4 seasons in MLS; played for the Botswana national team
 Jack Jewsbury (2002) — has played in MLS since 2003; currently plays for the Portland Timbers
 Vedad Ibišević (2003) — currently plays for Hertha BSC in Germany; played for Bosnia at the 2014 World Cup
 Will John (2004) — played 3 seasons in MLS before moving to play in Europe
 Tim Ward (2004) — played 8 seasons in MLS
 Martin Hutton (2004) — 2 seasons in MLS from 2005 to 2006
 John DiRaimondo (2006) — played 3 seasons in MLS from 2007 to 2009
 Brandon Barklage (2008) —  played 7 seasons in MLS from 2009 to 2015
 Dado Hamzagić (2008) — played professionally two seasons in Bosnia from 2009 to 2011
 Tim Ream (2009) — several professional seasons in MLS and in England; 50 U.S. national team caps, including every minute of the team's four games in the 2022 FIFA World Cup
 Chad Vandegriffe (2012) — played professionally in USL, MISL, and MASL

Note: The number in parentheses indicates the year the player graduated from SLU; for those who didn't graduate from SLU, the number indicates the last year they played for SLU.

Honors 
College Cup (10)
 1959, 1960, 1962, 1963, 1965, 1967(co-champion) 1969, 1970, 1972, & 1973

Atlantic 10 Tournament
 2009, 2012, 2021, 2022

See also
 A Time for Champions, a film which chronicled the school's soccer dominance in the 1960s and 70s.
 Keough Award — given to the top male and female soccer players from the St. Louis, Missouri area. 
 St. Louis Soccer Hall of Fame
 Soccer in St. Louis
 Saint Louis–SIU Edwardsville men's soccer rivalry

References

External links 

 

 
B